Pauline Browes  (born May 7, 1938) is a former Canadian politician. She was a Member of Parliament between 1984 and 1993.

An educator by training, Browes was first elected to the House of Commons of Canada as the Progressive Conservative Member of Parliament for the riding of Scarborough Centre in the 1984 federal election. The PCs, led by Brian Mulroney, won power with the largest majority government in Canadian history.

She served as parliamentary secretary to the Minister of the Environment from 1986 to 1989, and as parliamentary secretary to both the Secretary of State for Canada and the Minister of State for multiculturalism and citizenship from 1989 until 1991. In that year, Mulroney appointed her to Cabinet as Minister of State for the Environment.

In January 1993, she was moved to the position of Minister of State for Employment and Immigration. When Kim Campbell succeeded Mulroney as PC leader and Prime Minister of Canada in June 1993, she promoted Browes to Minister of Indian Affairs and Northern Development. However, in the subsequent 1993 federal election, the Campbell government was defeated and Browes lost her seat.

During the 1995 Ontario provincial election, she served as a special advisor to the Progressive Conservative Party of Ontario election campaign won by Mike Harris, who became Premier of Ontario. Harris subsequently appointed her Vice Chair of the Ontario Environmental Review Tribunal.

On April 20, 2005, the National Post reported that Browes had been recruited by the Conservative Party of Canada as one of their star candidates in the 2006 federal election. She ran in the riding of Scarborough—Guildwood, coming second to Liberal incumbent John McKay with 11,790 votes (28.7%).

She currently sits on the Joint Political Advisory Committee of the North American trilateral Commission for Environmental Cooperation.

References

External links
 

1938 births
Living people
Members of the 24th Canadian Ministry
Members of the 25th Canadian Ministry
Members of the House of Commons of Canada from Ontario
Progressive Conservative Party of Canada MPs
Members of the King's Privy Council for Canada
Canadian Ministers of Indian Affairs and Northern Development
Women members of the House of Commons of Canada
Women in Ontario politics
Canadian Anglicans
York University alumni
People from Northumberland County, Ontario
Women government ministers of Canada
20th-century Canadian women politicians